Darsajin (also Romanized as Darsajīn; also known as Darehsajīn, Darsahīn, and Darsakhin) is a village in Darsajin Rural District of the Central District of Abhar County, Zanjan province, Iran. At the 2006 National Census, its population was 549 in 168 households. The following census in 2011 counted 437 people in 150 households. The latest census in 2016 showed a population of 320 people in 125 households; it was the largest village in its rural district. The language of the people of this village is Lori Bakhtiari, which itself originated from ancient Persian

References 

Abhar County

Populated places in Zanjan Province

Populated places in Abhar County